Kilwaughter Halt railway station was on the Ballymena and Larne Railway which ran from Ballymena to Larne in Northern Ireland.

History

The station was located close to the hamlet of Kilwaughter and opened by the Ballymena and Larne Railway on 1 January 1888. It was taken over by the Belfast and Northern Counties Railway in July 1889. This was in turn taken over by the Northern Counties Committee in 1906.

The station closed to passengers on 1 October 1933.

References 

 
 
 

Disused railway stations in County Antrim
Railway stations opened in 1888
Railway stations closed in 1933
Railway stations in Northern Ireland opened in the 19th century